Agama lebretoni is a species of lizard in the family Agamidae. It is a small lizard found in Cameroon, Equatorial Guinea, Gabon, and Nigeria.

References

Agama (genus)
Agamid lizards of Africa
Reptiles of Cameroon
Reptiles of Equatorial Guinea
Reptiles of Gabon
Reptiles of Nigeria
Reptiles described in 2009
Taxa named by Andreas Schmitz
Taxa named by Michael F. Barej
Taxa named by Philipp Wagner